Alchornea sodiroi is a species of plant in the family Euphorbiaceae. It is endemic to Ecuador.  Its natural habitat is subtropical or tropical moist montane forests.

References

Alchorneae
Flora of Ecuador
Vulnerable plants
Taxonomy articles created by Polbot